Taylor Mackenzie Dickens Hale (born December 31, 1994), is an American reality television personality and former beauty pageant titleholder. She is the winner of the 24th season of the American reality television series Big Brother, becoming the first African-American woman to win the series. She is also the first houseguest to win both the game and the America's Favorite Houseguest prize.

Prior to Big Brother, she was crowned Miss Michigan USA 2021 and won Miss Congeniality at the Miss USA 2021 pageant.

Personal life 
Hale was born on December 31, 1994, in Detroit, Michigan. She attended Detroit Country Day School from kindergarten through grade 12, graduating in 2013. She graduated from George Washington University in 2017, where she was a member of Alpha Phi sorority. Hale resides in West Bloomfield, Michigan.

On November 9, 2022, she confirmed her relationship with fellow Big Brother 24 contestant Joseph Abdin.

Miss Michigan USA 
Hale competed in and won the Miss Michigan USA 2021 pageant in August 2021 after nearly a year-long postponement due to the COVID-19 pandemic in the United States. She did not place in the Miss USA 2021 Pageant, but she was awarded Miss Congeniality.

Big Brother 
CBS announced Hale as a Big Brother 24 houseguest on July 5, 2022. Hale's fellow housemates ostracized her upon entering the house, making her an early target in the game and leading to her being nominated for eviction during the first two weeks. Hale was the target of comments deemed microaggressive by some viewers of the show and disparaging remarks about her appearance and personality. During week three Hale joined "The Leftovers" alliance, securing her safety for the remainder of the season. Hale won two Head of Household competitions; during weeks six and 11.

Hale was awarded the $750,000 grand prize by the season's jury, winning by a vote of 8–1 over Monte Taylor and becoming the first African-American woman to win a regular season of Big Brother. She is also the first houseguest to win both the game and the America's Favorite Houseguest prize, awarding her an additional $50,000. With total cash winnings of $800,000, Hale has won the most money of any houseguest in the history of the series.

References 

1994 births
African-American beauty pageant winners
African-American female models
Big Brother (American TV series) winners
Columbian College of Arts and Sciences alumni
Detroit Country Day School alumni
Female models from Michigan
Living people
Television personalities from Detroit